This article is a List of National Historic Landmarks in New Hampshire. The National Historic Landmark program is operated in the United States under the auspices of the National Park Service, and recognizes structures, districts, objects, and similar resources nationwide according to a list of criteria of national significance. National Historic Landmarks are a subset of the properties listed in the larger National Register of Historic Places.

New Hampshire currently has 23 National Historic Landmarks; the most recent addition was The Epic of American Civilization murals located at Dartmouth College, added in 2013. Three of the sites—Canterbury Shaker Village, Harrisville Historic District, and the MacDowell Colony—are categorized as National Historic Landmark Districts. One site, the Augustus Saint-Gaudens Memorial, is categorized as a National Historical Park.

National Historic Landmarks in New Hampshire

|}

Related state and federal historic sites
Of the state's National Historic Landmarks, the National Park Service operates only one, the Augustus Saint-Gaudens Memorial.  The state operates some of them as historic sites:
Franklin Pierce Homestead Historic Site
Robert Frost Farm Historic Site
Wentworth-Coolidge Mansion Historic Site
The state also operates the Daniel Webster Birthplace State Historic Site, which is not far from the Daniel Webster Family Home listed above.

See also
National Register of Historic Places listings in New Hampshire

References

External links 

 National Historic Landmarks Program, at National Park Service

New Hampshire

 
National Historic Landmarks
National Historic Landmarks